Dunnell is a city in Martin County, Minnesota, United States. The population was 167 at the 2010 census.

History
A post office called Dunnell has been in operation since 1873. The city was named for Mark H. Dunnell, a member of the U.S. House of Representatives from Minnesota.

Geography
The community is located between Sherburn and Estherville, Iowa on Minnesota State Highway 4. Interstate 90 is nearby.

Demographics

2010 census
As of the census of 2010, there were 167 people, 80 households, and 50 families living in the city. The racial makeup of the city was 98.2% White and 1.8% Native American. Hispanic or Latino of any race were 1.8% of the population.

There were 80 households, of which 17.5% had children under the age of 18 living with them, 56.3% were married couples living together, 5.0% had a female householder with no husband present, 1.3% had a male householder with no wife present, and 37.5% were non-families. 30.0% of all households were made up of individuals, and 8.8% had someone living alone who was 65 years of age or older. The average household size was 2.09 and the average family size was 2.56.

The median age in the city was 51.8 years. 14.4% of residents were under the age of 18; 3% were between the ages of 18 and 24; 20.4% were from 25 to 44; 40.2% were from 45 to 64; and 22.2% were 65 years of age or older. The gender makeup of the city was 54.5% male and 45.5% female.

2000 census
As of the census of 2000, there were 197 people, 83 households, and 52 families living in the city. The racial makeup of the city was 98.98% White, and 1.02% from two or more races.

There were 83 households, out of which 34.9% had children under the age of 18 living with them, 49.4% were married couples living together, 6.0% had a female householder with no husband present, and 37.3% were non-families. 34.9% of all households were made up of individuals, and 14.5% had someone living alone who was 65 years of age or older.  The average household size was 2.37 and the average family size was 3.10.

In the city, the population was spread out, with 25.9% under the age of 18, 8.1% from 18 to 24, 27.4% from 25 to 44, 20.8% from 45 to 64, and 17.8% who were 65 years of age or older.  The median age was 40 years. For every 100 females, there were 109.6 males.  For every 100 females age 18 and over, there were 121.2 males.

References

Cities in Minnesota
Cities in Martin County, Minnesota